North Northumberland (formally the "Northern Division of Northumberland") was a county constituency of the House of Commons of the Parliament of the United Kingdom. It was represented by two Members of Parliament (MPs), elected by the bloc vote system.

The area was created by the Great Reform Act of 1832 by the splitting of Northumberland constituency into Northern and Southern divisions.

It was abolished by the Redistribution of Seats Act 1885, when Northumberland was divided into four single member divisions: Berwick-upon-Tweed, Hexham, Tyneside and Wansbeck.

Boundaries
1832–1885: The Wards of Bamborough, Coquetdale, Glendale and Morpeth, and the Berwick Bounds.

Members of Parliament
Constituency created (1832)

Elections

Elections in the 1830s

 
 

 
 

Grey was appointed as Secretary at War, requiring a by-election.

Elections in the 1840s

Elections in the 1850s

 
 

 

Percy was appointed a Civil Lord of the Admiralty, requiring a by-election.

Percy was appointed Vice-President of the Board of Trade, requiring a by-election.

Elections in the 1860s

Elections in the 1870s

 

Percy was appointed Treasurer of the Household, causing a by-election.

Elections in the 1880s

See also 

 History of parliamentary constituencies and boundaries in Northumberland

Notes

Sources

Parliamentary constituencies in Northumberland (historic)
Constituencies of the Parliament of the United Kingdom established in 1832
Constituencies of the Parliament of the United Kingdom disestablished in 1885